The Robin Hood plan was a media nickname given to legislation enacted by the U.S. state of Texas in 1993 to provide court-mandated equitable school financing for all school districts in the state, in response to the Texas Supreme Court's ruling in Edgewood Independent School District v. Kirby.

The law "recaptured" property tax revenue from property-wealthy school districts and distributed those in property-poor districts, in an effort to equalize the financing of all school districts throughout Texas.

Background
Article 7 of the Texas Constitution states, in part, "it shall be the duty of the Legislature of the State to establish and make suitable provision for the support and maintenance of an efficient system of public free schools". However, the state of Texas only dedicates $.0025 portion of the state sales tax and the net proceeds from the Texas Lottery, as well as earnings from the Permanent School Fund, to primary and secondary education.  Otherwise, state funding is determined by the Texas Legislature.  The primary source of education funding in Texas remains with the school districts' ability to assess property taxes.

Initial lawsuit
In 1984, the Mexican American Legal Defense and Educational Fund filed suit against state Commissioner of Education William Kirby on behalf of the Edgewood Independent School District in San Antonio, citing discrimination against students in poor school districts. The plaintiffs charged that the state's methods of funding public schools violated the Texas state constitution, which required the state to provide an efficient public school system.

School finance lawsuits must take place in state court, since the U.S. Supreme Court ruled in 1973 that education is not a fundamental right protected by the U.S. Constitution (San Antonio v. Rodriguez). The case, Edgewood Independent School District v. Kirby, eventually went to the Texas Supreme Court, which unanimously sided with Edgewood.

Passage

Passage came in 1993, after the Texas Supreme Court threw out two attempts by the Texas Legislature to write a constitutional school-finance system. The Legislature finally passed a funding plan that was accepted by the Court, in 1993.

The goal of the system was an attempt to prohibit wealthy districts from being able to raise revenue to provide benefits which poorer districts could not.  Two provisions of the legislation would seek to implement this:
First, school districts were strictly limited to a $1.50 tax rate per $100 assessed property value for maintenance and operations (M&O).  School districts already over the limit could continue at that rate.  The tax rate was not capped for additional taxes assessed to pay for bond packages for facility construction or renovation.
Second, notwithstanding the rate cap, districts were limited to M&O revenues which did not exceed a statewide rate per student.  Any revenues in excess of the statewide rate were "recaptured" by the state and given to poorer districts.  The wealthy district could, in lieu of state recapture, enter into an agreement with a poorer district to transfer funds.  It is this portion of the legislation which earned it the "Robin Hood" name.

Ersatz state property tax, reform

But 10 years later, the Robin Hood plan was in jeopardy again. In November, 2005, the Texas Supreme Court ruled that, since the vast majority of school districts were having to tax at the maximum maintenance-and-operations (M&O) tax rate of $1.50 per $100 of property valuation just to raise enough money to meet state mandates, the school-finance system was, in effect, a state property tax, which is prohibited by the Texas Constitution. The Texas Legislature, meeting in a special session in April and May, 2006, passed legislation that met the court's requirements that local districts have "meaningful discretion" in setting tax rates.  A series of bills changed the school finance system to cut school M&O property taxes by one-third by 2008, but allowed local school boards to increase tax rates from the new, lower levels, although generally only with voter approval. Some of the local property tax revenue lost by the one-third cut will be replaced by state revenue from a new business tax and higher cigarette taxes. The Comptroller estimated a five-year $23 billion shortfall from the revised tax system.

See also
 Serrano v. Priest (California)
 Abbott v. Burke (New Jersey)
Redistributive change

References

Resources
Robin Hood Plan is Working World Internet News
"EDGEWOOD ISD V. KIRBY". The Handbook of Texas Online. Retrieved 27 October 2008.
 Schools and Taxes: A Summary of Legislation of the 2006 Special Session 

Education in Texas
Education finance in the United States
Economic inequality in the United States
Taxation and redistribution